Polyporus meridionalis is a species of fungus. First described in 1973 as a species of the now-defunct genus Leucoporus, it was transferred to Polyporus in 1980. In 2016, Zmitrovich and Kovalenko proposed a transfer to Cerioporus.

References

Fungi described in 1973
Polyporaceae